La Sonrisa is a suburb of Maldonado, Uruguay.

Geography
This suburb borders the suburbs Cerro Pelado to the north and Villa Delia to the northwest, while the urban limits of the city lie to its south and to its east. Directly to its west lies the Municipal Cemetery and the park Chacra Brunett.

Population
In 2011 La Sonrisa had a population of 1,562.
 
Source: Instituto Nacional de Estadística de Uruguay

References

External links
 INE map of Maldonado, Villa Delia, La Sonrisa, Cerro Pelado, Los Aromos and Pinares-Las Delicias

Populated places in the Maldonado Department